Sticky Notes is a desktop notes application included in Windows 7, Windows 8, and Windows 10. The app loads quickly and enables users to quickly take notes using post-it note–like windows on their desktop.

Sticky Notes originated in Windows XP Tablet Edition in 2002 and was included with Windows Vista as a gadget for the Windows Sidebar. According to Microsoft, there were eight million monthly Sticky Notes users as of April 2016. It's built in Outlook.com and Microsoft Teams.

Development
The original Sticky Notes was a gadget included with Windows Vista. Gadgets were continued in Windows 7, though Sticky Notes itself became a standalone app built on the Win32 platform, that could still open at startup. This version did not directly support pen input. The default color is yellow, but five other colors are offered. Sticky Notes have jumplists and a taskbar preview, which shows the notes in a stack. Sticky Notes are automatically saved. This version was reused in Windows 8 and the initial releases of Windows 10.

In the Windows 10 Anniversary Update, released in 2016, a new version of Sticky Notes built on the Universal Windows Platform was introduced. It can be launched as a standalone app or part of the Windows Ink workspace. The latter method causes the space behind the notes to become blurred. The new version directly accepts pen input and can recognize words and letters in handwritten text, basic text formatting, pictures. It is designed to be stick to the desktop or move around. The new Sticky Notes provides stock information when a ticker is typed or written, and it provides flight info when a flight number is typed or written. It has Cortana integration and can create reminders from notes that include a date. Unlike the Windows 7 version, this version's taskbar preview shows a stock image rather than the notes a user has created. It originally did not have a jump list, but that was added back in version 1.6.2 on February 6, 2017.

System Requirements (UWP app)

Cross-platform 
Sticky Notes can sync notes across multiple devices, not just to Windows 10 devices, but also to iOS and Android devices running Microsoft OneNote and Outlook for Windows. A web client to edit sticky notes is also available on the OneNote website, at the obscure onenote.com/stickynotes location.

On Android devices, Microsoft Launcher can show sticky notes synced with a local instance of the OneNote app.

References

External links
 Microsoft Sticky Notes on Windows Store

Universal Windows Platform apps
Windows 7
Windows 10
Windows components